Radcliffe Cricket Club are an English cricket team currently playing in Radcliffe, Bury, Greater Manchester in the Greater Manchester Cricket League. There are no junior teams.

References

External links
 Radcliffe Cricket Club information
 Salford Cricket Development Group League

Central Lancashire League cricket clubs
Sport in the Metropolitan Borough of Bury
Cricket in Greater Manchester
Radcliffe, Greater Manchester